Hugh Milburn Stone (July 5, 1904 – June 12, 1980) was an American actor, best known for his role as "Doc" (Dr. Galen Adams) on the CBS Western series Gunsmoke.

Early life
Stone was born in Burrton, Kansas, to Herbert Stone and the former Laura Belfield. There, he graduated from Burrton High School, where he was active in the drama club, played basketball, and sang in a barbershop quartet. Stone's brother, Joe Stone, says their uncle Fred Stone, was a versatile actor who appeared on Broadway and in circuses).

Although Stone had a congressional appointment to the United States Naval Academy, he turned it down, choosing instead to become an actor with a stock theater company headed by Helen Ross.

Career

In 1919, Stone debuted on stage in a Kansas tent show. He ventured into vaudeville in the late 1920s, and in 1930, he was half of the Stone and Strain song-and-dance act. His Broadway credits include Around the Corner (1936) and Jayhawker (1934).

In the 1930s, Stone came to Los Angeles, California, to launch his own screen career. He was featured in the Tailspin Tommy adventure serial for Monogram Pictures. In 1939 he played Stephen Douglass in the movie Young Mr. Lincoln with Henry Fonda and Ward Bond. In 1939 he appeared in When Tomorrow Comes as head busboy (uncredited). In 1940, he appeared with Marjorie Reynolds, Tristram Coffin, and I. Stanford Jolley in the comedy espionage film Chasing Trouble. That same year, he co-starred with Roy Rogers in the film Colorado in the role of Rogers' brother-gone-wrong.

Stone appeared uncredited in the 1939 film Blackwell's Island. Stone played Dr. Blake in the 1943 film Gung Ho! and a liberal-minded warden in Monogram Pictures' Prison Mutiny also in 1943. Signed by Universal Pictures in 1943, in the films Captive Wild Woman (1943), Jungle Woman (1943), Sherlock Holmes Faces Death [Captain Pat Vickery], (1944), he became a familiar face in its features and serials. In 1944, he portrayed a Ration Board representative in the Universal-produced public service film Prices Unlimited for the U.S. Office of Price Administration and the Office of War Information. One of his film roles was a radio columnist in the Gloria Jean-Kirby Grant musical I'll Remember April. He made such an impression in this film that Universal Studios gave him a starring role (and a similar characterization) in the 1945 serial The Master Key.  The same year, he was featured in the Inner Sanctum murder mystery The Frozen Ghost.  In 1953, Stone appeared as Charlton Heston's sidekick in Arrowhead, a Western also featuring Brian Keith and Katy Jurado.

In 1955, one of CBS Radio's hit series, the Western Gunsmoke, was adapted for television and recast with different actors for various reasons (William Conrad was judged too obese to play Matt Dillon on camera, Georgia Ellis wasn't viewed as quite telegenic enough to portray Kitty on television, etc.). Howard McNear, the radio Doc Adams (who later played Floyd the barber on television's The Andy Griffith Show), was replaced by Stone, who gave the role a harder edge consistent with his screen portrayals. He stayed with Gunsmoke through its entire television run, with the exception of 7 episodes in 1971, when Stone required heart surgery and Pat Hingle replaced him as Dr. Chapman. Stone appeared in 604 episodes through 1976, often shown sparring in a friendly manner with co-stars Dennis Weaver and Ken Curtis, who played, respectively, Chester Goode and Festus Haggen.

Personal life
Stone's brother, Joe, was a writer who was the author of scripts for three episodes of Gunsmoke.

Stone was a cousin of the character actress Madge Blake. 

In March 1971, Stone had heart bypass surgery at UAB Hospital in Birmingham, Alabama. In June 1980, Stone died of a heart attack in La Jolla. He was buried at the El Camino Memorial Park in Sorrento Valley, San Diego. 

Stone had a surviving daughter, Shirley Stone Gleason (born circa 1926) of Costa Mesa, California, from his first marriage of 12 years to Ellen Morrison, formerly of Delphos, Kansas, who died in 1937. 
His second wife, the former Jane Garrison, a native of Hutchinson, Kansas, died in 2002. Stone had married, divorced, and remarried Garrison.

Legacy

In 1968, Stone received an Emmy Award for Outstanding Performance by an Actor in a Supporting Role in a Drama for his work on Gunsmoke.

In 1975, Stone received an honorary doctorate from St. Mary of the Plains College in Dodge City, Kansas, where Gunsmoke was set but not filmed.

For his contribution to the television industry, Milburn Stone has a star on the Hollywood Walk of Fame at 6801 Hollywood Boulevard. In 1981, Stone was inducted posthumously into the Western Performers Hall of Fame at the National Cowboy & Western Heritage Museum in Oklahoma City. After his death, he left a legacy for the performing arts in Cecil County in northeastern Maryland, by way of the Milburn Stone Theatre in North East, Maryland.

Selected filmography

 Ladies Crave Excitement (1935) as Sailor (uncredited)
 Cheers of the Crowd (1935) as Reporter (uncredited)
 His Night Out (1935) as Salesman (uncredited)
 Rendezvous (1935) as Carter's Aide (uncredited)
 The Fighting Marines (1935, Serial) as Red - Henchman [Ch. 2,4-7,10,11] (uncredited)
 The Milky Way (1936) as Reporter (uncredited)
 The Princess Comes Across (1936) as American Reporter (uncredited)
 Nobody's Fool (1936) as Clerk (uncredited)
 China Clipper (1936) as Radio Operator
 The Three Mesquiteers (1936) as John
 Murder with Pictures (1936) as Operator (uncredited)
 Two in a Crowd (1936) as Kennedy (uncredited)
 Rose Bowl (1936) as Booster Club Band Member (uncredited)
 The Man I Marry (1936) as Stage manager (uncredited)
 The Accusing Finger (1936) as Convict (uncredited)
 Banjo on My Knee (1936) as Eddie - Sailor (uncredited)
 Three Smart Girls (1936) as Telegraph Desk Clerk (uncredited)
 A Doctor's Diary (1937) as Fred Clark
 Swing It, Professor (1937) as Lou Morgan
 They Gave Him a Gun (1937) as Defense Attorney (uncredited)
 Wings Over Honolulu (1937) as Telephone Operator (uncredited)
 The Man in Blue (1937) as Henchman 'Dutch'
 The Wildcatter (1937) as Ed
 You Can't Beat Love (1937) as Reporter Wilson (uncredited)
 The 13th Man (1937) as Jimmy Moran
 Blazing Barriers (1937) as Joe Waters
 Reported Missing! (1937) as Radio operator (uncredited)
 Atlantic Flight (1937) as Henry Wadsworth 'Pokey' Schultz
 Youth on Parole (1937) as Ratty
 Music for Madame (1937) as Detective (uncredited)
 Federal Bullets (1937) as Tommy Thompson, Federal Agent
 Mr. Boggs Steps Out (1938) as Burns
 The Port of Missing Girls (1938) as Jim Benton
 Sinners in Paradise (1938) as Honeyman
 Wives Under Suspicion (1938) as Kirk
 Paroled from the Big House (1938) as Commissioner Downey
 The Storm (1938) as Hagen - officer on SS Orion (uncredited)
 California Frontier (1938) as Mal Halstead
 Blackwell's Island (1938) as Max (deputy commissioner) (uncredited)
 Made for Each Other (1939) as Newark Official (uncredited)
 King of the Turf (1939) as Taylor
 Tail Spin (1939) as Kansas City Mechanic (uncredited)
 Society Smugglers (1939) as Peter Garfield
 Mystery Plane (1939) as 'Skeeter' Milligan
 The Spirit of Culver (1939) as Instructor (uncredited)
 Blind Alley (1939) as Nick
 Young Mr. Lincoln (1939) as Stephen A. Douglas (uncredited)
 Stunt Pilot (1939) as 'Skeeter' Milligan
 When Tomorrow Comes (1939) as Head Busboy (uncredited)
 Tropic Fury (1939) as Thomas E. Snell
 Danger Flight (1939) as Skeeter Milligan 
 Fighting Mad (1939) as Cardigan
 Crashing Thru (1939) as Delos Harrington
 Nick Carter, Master Detective (1939) as Dave Krebs
 The Big Guy (1939) as Publicity man (uncredited)
 Charlie McCarthy, Detective (1939) as Joe Felton (uncredited)
 Chasing Trouble (1940) as Pat Callahan
 Framed (1940) as Mathew Mattison
 Black Friday (1940) as Reporter at Execution (uncredited)
 Johnny Apollo (1940) as Main Reporter (uncredited)
 Enemy Agent (1940) as Meeker
 An Angel from Texas (1940) as 'Pooch' Davis (uncredited)
 Lillian Russell (1940) as Jack - Reporter (uncredited)
 Public Deb No. 1 (1940) as Reporter (uncredited)
 Colorado (1940) as Don Burke alias Captain Mason
 Give Us Wings (1940) as Tex Austin
 The Great Plane Robbery (1940 film) as Krebber
 The Phantom Cowboy (1941) as Stan Borden
 The Great Train Robbery (1941) as Duke Logan
 Death Valley Outlaws (1941) as Jeff
 No Hands on the Clock (1941) as FBI Man (uncredited)
 Frisco Lil (1942) as Mike
 Reap the Wild Wind (1942) as Lieutenant Farragut
 Pacific Rendezvous (1942) as Park Hotel Desk Clerk (uncredited)
 Rubber Racketeers (1942) as Angel
 Invisible Agent (1942) as German Sergeant (uncredited)
 Police Bullets (1942) as Johnny Reilly
 Eyes in the Night (1942) as Detective Pete (uncredited)
 Silent Witness (1943) as Racketeer Joe Manson
 You Can't Beat the Law (1943) as Frank Sanders
 Submarine Alert (1943) as Lt. Winston - Naval Intelligence (uncredited)
 Keep 'Em Slugging (1943) as Duke Redman
 Captive Wild Woman (1943) as Fred Mason
 Get Going (1943) as Mr. Tuttle
 Destroyer (1943) as Radioman (uncredited)
 Sherlock Holmes Faces Death (1943) as Captain Vickery
 Corvette K-225 (1943) as Canadian Captain (uncredited)
 The Mad Ghoul (1943) as Macklin
 Gung Ho! (1943) as Cmdr. Blake
 The Impostor (1944) as Chauzel
 Phantom Lady (1944) as District Attorney (voice)
 Weird Woman (1944) as Radio Announcer (voice, uncredited)
 Hat Check Honey (1944) as David Courtland
 Hi, Good Lookin'! (1944) as Bill Eaton
 Moon Over Las Vegas (1944) as Jim Bradley
 The Great Alaskan Mystery (1944, Serial) as Jim Hudson
 Gambler's Choice (1944) as Doctor (uncredited)
 Twilight on the Prairie (1944) as Gainsworth
 Jungle Woman (1944) as Fred Mason
 She Gets Her Man (1945) as 'Tommy Gun' Tucker
 I'll Remember April (1945) as Willie Winchester
 The Master Key (1945, Serial) as Agent Tom Brant
 Swing Out, Sister (1945) as Tim Colby
 The Frozen Ghost (1945) as George Keene
 On Stage Everybody (1945) as Fitzgerald
 The Beautiful Cheat (1945) as Lucius Haven
 Strange Confession (1945) as Stevens
 The Royal Mounted Rides Again (1945, Serial) as Brad Taggart
 The Daltons Ride Again (1945) as Parker W. Graham
 The Scarlet Horseman (1946, Serial) as Narrator (voice, uncredited)
 Little Giant (1946) as Prof. Watkins (voice, uncredited)
 Smooth as Silk (1946) as John Kimble
 The Spider Woman Strikes Back (1946) as Mr. Moore
 Strange Conquest (1946) as Bert Morrow
 Her Adventurous Night (1946) as Cop #1
 Inside Job (1946) as District Attorney Sutton
 Danger Woman (1946) as Gerald King
 Little Miss Big (1946) as Father Lennergan
 The Michigan Kid (1947) as Lanny Slade
 Smash-Up: The Story of a Woman (1947) as Raven Club Announcer (voice, uncredited)
 Buck Privates Come Home (1947) as Announcer
 Time Out of Mind (1947 film) as Stage Manager (uncredited)
 Killer Dill (1947) as Maboose
 Cass Timberlane (1947) as Nestor Purdwin (uncredited)
 Heading for Heaven (1947) as Elwood Harding
 Killer McCoy (1947) as Henchman (uncredited)
 Train to Alcatraz (1948) as Bart Kanin
 The Judge (1949) as Martin Strang
 The Green Promise (1949) as Reverend Jim Benton
 Sky Dragon (1949) as Capt. Tim Norton
 Calamity Jane and Sam Bass (1949) as Abe Jones
 No Man of Her Own (1950) as Plainclothesman
 Snow Dog (1950) as Dr. F. J. McKenzie
 The Fireball (1950) as Jeff Davis
 Branded (1950) as Dawson
 Operation Pacific (1951) as Ground Control Officer (uncredited)
 Flying Leathernecks (1951) as Fleet CIC Radio Operator (uncredited)
 Roadblock (1951) as Ray Evans
 The Racket (1951) as Member of Craig's Team (uncredited)
 The Atomic City (1952) as Insp. Harold Mann
 The Savage (1952) as Cpl. Martin
 Invaders from Mars (1953) as Capt. Roth
 The Sun Shines Bright (1953) as Horace K. Maydew
 Pickup on South Street (1953) as Detective Winoki
 Second Chance (1953) as Edward Dawson
 Arrowhead (1953) as Sandy MacKinnon
 Siege at Red River (1954) as Sgt. Benjamin 'Benjy' Guderman
 Black Tuesday (1954) as Father Slocum
 The Long Gray Line (1955) as Capt. John Pershing
 White Feather (1955) as Commissioner Trenton
 Smoke Signal (1955) as Sgt. Miles
 The Private War of Major Benson (1955) as Maj. Gen. Wilton J. Ramsey
 Gunsmoke (1955-1975, TV Series) as Doc Adams (final appearance)
 Drango (1957) as Col. Bracken

Notes

References

External links

1904 births
1980 deaths
20th-century American male actors
Western (genre) television actors
Male actors from San Diego
American male film actors
American male television actors
Outstanding Performance by a Supporting Actor in a Drama Series Primetime Emmy Award winners
Male actors from Kansas
People from Harvey County, Kansas
People from Greater Los Angeles
People from San Diego